Shree Shyam Mandir, Ghusuri is a temple located in Howrah, one of the main trade hubs in the Indian city of Kolkata. Ghusuri Dham is the biggest Khatu Shyam Temple in Eastern Region of India.

Brief history 
The temple was built by Shree Shyam Satsang Mandal, Ghusuridham with the help and support of Shyam Bhakts in Kolkata.

Opening times 
The temple remains open from 6:00 a.m. to 1:00 p.m. and 4:00 pm to 9:00 p.m.

References 

Hindu temples